Vineyard Lake is an unincorporated community and census-designated place (CDP) in Jackson County in the U.S. state of Michigan. The CDP had a population of 980 at the 2010 census.  It is located within Columbia Township to the west and Norvell Township to the east.

History
The community of Vineyard Lake was listed as a newly-organized census-designated place for the 2010 census, meaning it now has officially defined boundaries and population statistics for the first time.

Geography

The community is in southeastern Jackson County, in the southeast corner of Columbia Township and the southwest corner of Norvell Township. It is bordered to the south by Cambridge Township in Lenawee County. The CDP surrounds Vineyard Lake, a natural water body along the River Raisin. The CDP includes the unincorporated communities of Sunset Beach and The Heights, each on the east side of the lake.

State highway M-124 forms the northern border of the Vineyard Lake CDP; the highway leads west  to Brooklyn and southeast  to Hayes State Park at Wamplers Lake.

Demographics

References

Unincorporated communities in Jackson County, Michigan
Unincorporated communities in Michigan
Census-designated places in Jackson County, Michigan
Census-designated places in Michigan